The Palos Verdes Peninsula Transit Authority is the primary provider of mass transportation in the Los Angeles suburbs of Rancho Palos Verdes, Palos Verdes Estates, Rolling Hills, and Rolling Hills Estates, California. Six color routes provide local service, while Routes 225 and 226 both allow for connections in Torrance and Route 226 also continues into the Los Angeles district of San Pedro.

Routes
Blue Route- Rancho Palos Verdes Park & Ride to The Shops at Palos Verdes
Gold Route- Rancho Palos Verdes Park & Ride to Miraleste Plaza
Green Route- Crestridge to Eastview
Silver Route- The Shops at Palos Verdes to Palos Verdes High School
White Route- The Shops at Palos Verdes to Paseo del Mar
Orange Line- Palos Verdes Reservoir to Paseo del Mar
Route 225- San Pedro - Rancho Palos Verdes Park & Ride to Redondo Beach Rivera Village
Route 226- Valencia to San Pedro Hospital

References

Bus transportation in California
Transit Authority
Public transportation in Los Angeles County, California
Transit agencies in California
Transportation in Los Angeles County, California